Eden William Love (14 October 1909 – 22 August 1991) was an Australian Rugby Union player and veterinarian who practised in Launceston, Tasmania.

Early life
Love was born in Burwood, New South Wales and attended Newington College (1921–1927). He graduated from the University of Sydney in Veterinary Science in 1935.

Rugby career
As a prop, Love played for the Australia national rugby union team in three test matches, making his debut in the Australia v New Zealand at Sydney on 2 July 1932.

War service
During World War II, Love served as a Lieutenant in the Australian Army and as a member of C Company, 2/3 Machine Gun Battalion, was taken as a prisoner of war during the Japanese occupation of Indonesia in Java.

References

1909 births
1991 deaths
People from Tasmania
People educated at Newington College
University of Sydney alumni
Australia international rugby union players
Australian rugby union players
Rugby union props
Australian Army personnel of World War II
Australian Army officers
Australian prisoners of war
World War II prisoners of war held by Japan
Rugby union players from Sydney